A Flame My Love, a Frequency is the sixth studio album by French singer-songwriter Colleen. It was released on 20 October 2017 through Thrill Jockey.

Track listing

References

2017 albums
Thrill Jockey albums
Colleen (musician) albums